The New Zealand cricket team are scheduled to tour Pakistan in April and May 2023 to play five One Day International (ODI) matches and five Twenty20 International (T20I) matches. The ODI matches are not part of the Super League. The tour is to make up for the series that was postponed in September 2021.

In April 2022, the Pakistan Cricket Board (PCB) confirmed that the series would be taking place. In May 2022, New Zealand Cricket confirmed that they would compensate the PCB for the postponed series, as well as playing extra matches on the tour. In October 2022, the PCB announced the fixtures for the tour. In March 2023, the PCB announced the revised fixtures for the tour.

Prior to this tour, New Zealand  toured Pakistan in December 2022 and January 2023 to play two Test matches and three ODIs.

T20I series

1st T20I

2nd T20I

3rd T20I

4th T20I

5th T20I

ODI series

1st ODI

2nd ODI

3rd ODI

4th ODI

5th ODI

References

External links
 Series home at ESPNcricinfo

2023 in Pakistani cricket
2023 in New Zealand cricket
International cricket competitions in 2022–23
New Zealand cricket tours of Pakistan